Dahu is a legendary creature in European popular culture.

Dahu may also refer to:

Places

China
Dahu, Liuyang, a town in Liuyang, Hunan

Iran
Dahu, Bushehr, a village in Bushehr Province
Dahu, Zarand, a village in Kerman Province

Taiwan
Dahu, Miaoli, a township in southern Miaoli County
Dahu Park, a park and lake in Taipei

Other uses
Dahu (instrument), a Chinese bowed string instrument
Dahu (clothing), a Han Chinese clothing which originated in the Ming dynasty.
Dahu, courtesy name of Sun Luban, Chinese princess of the Eastern Wu state in the Three Kingdoms period